In abstract algebra, a branch of mathematics, an affine monoid is a commutative monoid that is finitely generated, and is isomorphic to a submonoid of a free abelian group  .  Affine monoids are closely connected to convex polyhedra, and their associated algebras are of much use in the algebraic study of these geometric objects.

Characterization 
 Affine monoids are finitely generated. This means for a monoid , there exists  such that  
.

 Affine monoids are cancellative. In other words, 
 implies that  for all , where  denotes the binary operation on the affine monoid .

 Affine monoids are also torsion free.

Properties and examples 
 The intersection of two affine monoids is an affine monoid.

Affine monoids

Group of differences 

If  is an affine monoid, it can be embedded into a group. More specifically, there is a unique group , called the group of differences, in which  can be embedded.

Definition 
 defines the addition.

Universal property 

If  is an affine monoid, then the monoid homomorphism  defined by  satisfies the following universal property:

for any monoid homomorphism , where  is a group, there is a unique group homomorphism , such that , and since affine monoids are cancellative, it follows that  is an embedding. In other words, every affine monoid can be embedded into a group.

Normal affine monoids

Definition 
 If  is a submonoid of an affine monoid , then the submonoid

If , then  is integrally closed.

Affine monoid rings 
 see also: Group ring

Definition 

 Let  be an affine monoid, and  a commutative ring. Then one can form the affine monoid ring . This is an -module with a free basis , so if , then 

Connection to convex geometry 
Affine monoids arise naturally from convex polyhedra, convex cones, and their associated discrete structures.

Then  is an affine monoid. (Lemma 2.9, Gordan's lemma)
Then  is a finitely generated module over the affine monoid . (Theorem 2.12)

See also 
 Monoid
 Convex cone
 Convex polytope
 Lattice (group)
 K-theory

References 

Algebraic structures